A hoard is a collection of valuable objects or artifacts, sometimes purposely buried in the ground.

Hoard may also refer to:

Places
 Hoard, West Virginia, an unincorporated community in Monongalia County, West Virginia, United States
 Hoard, Wisconsin, a town in Clark County, Wisconsin, United States

People
 Hoard (surname)

Arts, entertainment, and media
 Hoard (video game), a 2010 action-strategy video game developed by Big Sandwich Games 
 Hoard's Dairyman, a dairy industry magazine

Other uses
 Hoard memory allocator, a memory allocator for Linux, Solaris, Microsoft Windows and other operating systems

See also
 Hoarding (disambiguation)
 Horde (disambiguation)